USNS VADM K. R. Wheeler (T-AG-5001), (formerly (AG-5001)), is an Offshore Petroleum Distribution System (OPDS) ship built in 2007. The ship is named after Vice Admiral Kenneth Ray Wheeler, an American sailor who was a Legion of Merit recipient and Prisoner of War during World War II.

Construction and commissioning 
The ship was built in 2007 by Edison Chouest Offshore, Louisiana. Later acquired and placed in service with the Military Sealift Command (MSC) on 20 September 2007, at Eglin Air Force Base, Florida under a 5 year contract. She was put into the Prepositioning Program and the Maritime Prepositioning Ship Squadron 3. The ship operates in the Pacific Ocean.

She supported the Combined Joint Logistics Over-the-Shore (CJLOTS) 2015 exercise off South Korea on 3 July 2015. Military officials including Vice Adm. Joseph P. Aucoin, commander of U.S. 7th Fleet, attended a tour of the OPDS VADM K. R. Wheeler during Exercise Ssang Yong 16, off Pohang on 17 March 2016.

The ship together with Task Force-West assisted the islands of Tinian and Saipan after they were struck by Typhoon Yutu on 24 October 2018.

References

Transports of the United States Navy
Ships built in Louisiana
2007 ships